is a former Japanese football player.

Playing career
Nomiyama was born in Kagoshima on April 28, 1975. After dropped out from Kyushu Sangyo University, he joined Gamba Osaka in 1995. On June 15, 1996, he debuted in J.League Cup against Sanfrecce Hiroshima. Although he played for the club until 1997, he could hardly play in the match. He retired end of 1997 season.

Club statistics

References

External links

1975 births
Living people
Kyushu Sangyo University alumni
Association football people from Kagoshima Prefecture
Japanese footballers
J1 League players
Gamba Osaka players
Association football midfielders
People from Kagoshima